The 1981 Kentucky Wildcats football team represented the University of Kentucky in the Southeastern Conference (SEC) during the 1981 NCAA Division I-A football season.  In their ninth and final season under head coach Fran Curci, the Wildcats compiled a 3–8 record (2–4 against SEC opponents), finished in a tie for sixth place in the SEC, and were outscored by their opponents, 224 to 134.  The team played its home games in Commonwealth Stadium in Lexington, Kentucky.

The team's statistical leaders included Randy Jenkins with 1,079 passing yards, Lawrence Lee with 275 rushing yards, and Rick Massie with 448 receiving yards.

At the end of November 1981, Curci was fired by the University of Kentucky.  The decision followed four losing seasons, arrests of 18 players from 1978 to 1981, and recruiting violations that resulted in the program being placed on probation.

Schedule

References

Kentucky
Kentucky Wildcats football seasons
Kentucky Wildcats football